Pseudagrion inopinatum, the Badplaas sprite or Balinsky's sprite is a species of damselfly in the family Coenagrionidae. It is endemic to South Africa. Its natural habitats include open rivers with abundant marginal vegetation.

References

External links

 Pseudagrion inopinatum on African Dragonflies and Damselflies Online

Coenagrionidae
Endangered biota of Africa
Taxa named by Boris Balinsky
Insects described in 1971